Trayan Krastev Stoilov, also known as Trayan Lakavishki, was a Bulgarian revolutionary, and leader of the Internal Macedonian Revolutionary Organization (IMRO).

Biography 
He was born in the village of Lyuboten, a region of the former Ottoman Empire, which is now in the Municipality of Štip in North Macedonia. He left without education. He participated in the reconstruction of the IMRO after 1919. From 1923 to 1934, he was a leader in Shtipsko. In an attack on the Serbs, in the village of Lyuboten, the detachment of Trayan Lakavishki and Grigor Hadjikimov, which is Vlado Chernozemski, destroyed 20 soldiers.

He was killed by communists and Kyustendil after the Bulgarian coup d'état of 1944.

References 

Year of birth unknown
1944 deaths
Members of the Internal Macedonian Revolutionary Organization